Togo is divided into 5 regions, which are subdivided in turn into 30 prefectures and 1 commune, which are further subdivided in turn into 300+ cantons.

ISO 3166-2:TG assigns codes for the 5 regions.

 
Togo
Togo

ko:토고의 지역